Ekango Lomuve is a village in the Ohangwena Region of northern Namibia. It belongs to Okongo Constituency. This village was founded in 1961 by Joseph Shinyongo who built the first house here and subsequently served as village head. When Joseph Shinyongo died 27/10/ 2000, his son Temus Shinyongo succeeded him as headman.

Ekango Lomuve is an Oshiwambo reference to its location in a pan with one distinguished Omuve tree.

References

Populated places in the Ohangwena Region
Oshiwambo words and phrases